Bom Jesus da Lapa is a municipality in Bahia, Brazil located  from the state capital. The population as of 2020 was recorded at 69,662 according to the Brazilian Institute of Geography and Statistics. The city covers a total area of  along the banks of the São Francisco River. Its economy is based on agriculture, commerce, tourism and fishing. The current mayor is Eures Ribeiro Pereira. It is the site of the Roman Catholic Diocese of Bom Jesus da Lapa.

The city is home to the third largest Catholic festival in Brazil, known as the Romaria (Portuguese for "Procession" or "Pilgrimage") of Bom Jesus drawing as many as 800,000 visitors or "Romeiros" to the city annually. For this reason, the city is known as "Capital Baiana da Fé" (The Bahian Capital of Faith).

Bom Jesus da Lapa is distinguished by other cities in the region by its Gothic style wall and nearby caves.

History 
It is one of the older towns in Brazil being founded in 1693. It did not reach the status of city until 1953. The name means "Good Jesus of the Grotto." This might relate to a nearby cavern that naturally had "church-like" structures so was converted to a chapel. The chapel began in the seventeenth century and is a significant pilgrimage site in Brazil.

Transportation 
The city is served by Bom Jesus da Lapa Airport.

References

External links 

Municipalities in Bahia